The Texas Ranger is a 1931 American pre-Code Western film directed by D. Ross Lederman.

Cast
 Buck Jones as Jim Logan, Texas Ranger
 Carmelita Geraghty as Helen Clayton
 Harry Woods as Matt Taylor
 Ed Brady as Nevady
 Nelson McDowell as 'High-Pockets' (as Nelson McDowel)
 Harry Todd as Lynn Oldring/Clayton Rider
 Billy Bletcher as Tubby
 Budd Fine as Henchman 'Breed'
 Bert Woodruff as Clayton, Helen's Father
 Silver as Silver, Jim's Horse

References

External links
 

1931 films
1931 Western (genre) films
American Western (genre) films
American black-and-white films
1930s English-language films
Films about the Texas Ranger Division
Films directed by D. Ross Lederman
Columbia Pictures films
1930s American films